Actinocatenispora rupis is an aerobic bacterium from the genus Actinocatenispora which has been isolated from cliff soil from Mara Island, Korea.

References 

Micromonosporaceae
Bacteria described in 2009